Yevgeniya Subbotina (born 30 October 1989) is a Russian middle-distance runner. She competed in the 800 metres event at the 2015 World Championships in Athletics in Beijing, China.

References

1989 births
Living people
Place of birth missing (living people)
Russian female middle-distance runners
World Athletics Championships athletes for Russia
Russian Athletics Championships winners